Puneri Paltan is a kabaddi team which represents the city of Pune, Maharashtra, India in the Pro Kabaddi League. The team, coached by BC Ramesh, plays at the Shree Shiv Chhatrapati Sports Complex. Puneri Paltan, a founding member of the Pro Kabaddi League, has been relatively unsuccessful after finishing last during its first two seasons (2014 and 2015). The Paltans did learn from their mistakes during the 2016(January) season, making the playoffs for the first time and eventually finishing third. After narrowly missing the playoffs in the 2016 (June) season, they earned a playoff spot in 2017 season. In the 2018-19 season, the team failed to qualify for the playoffs.
 Inconsistency has been the major reason that has hampered Pune's success throughout the Pro Kabaddi League. On 15 December 2022 Puneri Paltan beat Tamil Thalaivas in the semi final of 9th season of Vivo Pro Kabaddi League and advanced to their maiden pro kabbadi league final to face Jaipur Pink Panthers.

Overview 
The Pro Kabaddi League's first season was in 2014, with eight teams. Four teams were added for the league's fifth season, bringing the total to 12. Its log includes a lion, the team mascot.

Colours, logo and mascot

Colours
Puneri Paltan's current team colors are orange and vermilion, traditional colors in Maratha culture. Though Logo was changed in SEASON VII , its colours remained same.

Logo and Mascot
Puneri paltan's older logo had Dhal (shield) & two talwars behind it. Illustration of Side-faced lionhead was also present in that logo. There was a Chandrakor on the 'i' of word 'puneri'. The logo had orange and silver colours.

Current logo was introduced in SEASON VII. New logo has a front-facing Lion-head illustration. The lion has a white Chandrakor Tilak on forehead.

Lion includes aspects like leadership, royalty, power & strength.

Current squad

Seasons

Season I

Puneri Paltan finished eighth in its first season.

Season II

Puneri Paltan finished last in the second consecutive season.

Season III

Season IV

Season V

Bengal Warriors finished 8th in the Fourth season.

Season VI

Season VII

Season VIII

Season IX

Records

Overall results Pro Kabbaddi season

By opposition
''Note: Table lists in alphabetical order.

Sponsors

References

External links 
 Official website

Pro Kabaddi League teams
Sport in Pune
2014 establishments in Maharashtra
Kabaddi clubs established in 2014
Sport in Maharashtra